Rutkiewicz is a Polish surname. Notable people with the surname include:

 Kevin Rutkiewicz (born 1980), Scottish footballer
 Marek Rutkiewicz (born 1981), Polish cyclist
 Maria Rutkiewicz (1917-2007), Polish communist
 Wanda Rutkiewicz (1943–1992), Polish mountain climber

Polish-language surnames